The second Prodi government was the cabinet of the government of Italy from 17 May 2006 to 8 May 2008, a total of 722 days, or 1 year, 11 months and 21 days. The 59th cabinet of the Italian Republic, it was the only cabinet of the XV Legislature.

It was composed of 24 ministers, 10 deputy-ministers and 66 under-secretaries, for a total of 102 members.

This was the first government of the Republic in which the Communist Refoundation Party and the Italian Radicals participated directly, and the first government supported by the entire parliamentary left wing since the De Gasperi III Cabinet in 1947.

Formation
Romano Prodi led his coalition to the electoral campaign preceding the election, eventually won by a very narrow margin of 25,000 votes, and a final majority of two seats in the Senate, on 10 April. Prodi's appointment was somewhat delayed, as the outgoing President of the Republic, Carlo Azeglio Ciampi, ended his mandate in May, not having enough time for the usual procedure (consultations made by the President, appointment of a Prime Minister, motion of confidence and oath of office). After the acrimonious election of Giorgio Napolitano to replace Ciampi, Prodi could proceed with his transition to government. On 16 May he was invited by Napolitano to form a government. The following day, 17 May 2006, Prodi and his second cabinet were sworn into office.

Romano Prodi obtained the support for his cabinet on 19 May at the Senate and on 23 May at the Chamber of Deputies. Also on 18 May, Prodi laid out some sense of his new foreign policy when he pledged to withdraw Italian troops from Iraq and called the Iraq War a "grave mistake that has not solved but increased the problem of security".

First crisis
The coalition led by Romano Prodi, thanks to the electoral law which gave the winner a sixty-seat majority, can count on a good majority in the Chamber of Deputies but only on a very narrow majority in the Senate. The composition of the coalition was heterogeneous, combining parties of communist ideology, the Party of Italian Communists and Communist Refoundation Party, within the same government as parties of Catholic inspiration, The Daisy and UDEUR. The latter was led by Clemente Mastella, former chairman of Christian Democracy. Therefore, according to critics, it was difficult to have a single policy in different key areas, such as economics and foreign politics (for instance, Italian military presence in Afghanistan). In his earlier months as PM, Prodi had a key role in the creation of a multinational peacekeeping force in Lebanon following the 2006 Israel-Lebanon conflict.

Prodi's government faced a crisis over policies in early 2007, after just nine months of government. Three ministers in Prodi's Cabinet boycotted a vote in January to continue funding for Italian troop deployments in Afghanistan. Lawmakers approved the expansion of the US military base Caserma Ederle at the end of January, but the victory was so narrow that Deputy Prime Minister Francesco Rutelli criticised members of the coalition who had not supported the government. At around the same time, Justice Minister Clemente Mastella, of the coalition member UDEUR, said he would rather see the government fall than support its unwed couples legislation.

Tens of thousands of people marched in Vicenza against the expansion of Caserma Ederle, which saw the participation of some leading far-left members of the government. Harsh debates followed in the Italian Senate on 20 February 2007. Deputy Prime Minister and Foreign Affairs Minister Massimo D'Alema declared during an official visit in Ibiza, Spain that, without a majority on foreign policy affairs, the government would resign. The following day, D'Alema gave a speech at the Senate representing the government, clarifying his foreign policy and asking the Senate to vote for or against it. In spite of the fear of many senators that Prodi's defeat would return Silvio Berlusconi to power, the Senate did not approve a motion backing Prodi's government foreign policy, two votes shy of the required majority of 160.

After a Government meeting on 21 February, Romano Prodi tendered his resignation to the President Giorgio Napolitano, who cut short an official visit to Bologna in order to receive the Prime Minister. Prodi's spokesman indicated that he would only agree to form a new Government "if, and only if, he is guaranteed the full support of all the parties in the majority from now on". On 22 February, centre-left coalition party leaders backed a non-negotiable list of twelve political conditions given by Prodi as conditions of his remaining in office. President Napolitano held talks with political leaders on 23 February to decide whether to confirm Prodi's Government, ask Prodi to form a new government or call fresh elections.

Following these talks, on 24 February, President Napolitano asked Prodi to remain in office but to submit to a vote of confidence in both houses. On 28 February, the Senate voted to grant confidence to Prodi's Government. Though facing strong opposition from the centre-right coalition, the vote resulted in a 162–157 victory. Prodi then faced a vote of confidence in the lower house on 2 March, which he won as expected with a large majority of 342–198.

On 14 October 2007, Prodi oversaw the merger of two main parties of the Italian centre-left, Democrats of the Left and The Daisy, creating the Democratic Party. Prodi himself led the merger of the two parties, which had been planned over a twelve-year period, and became the first President of the party. He announced his resignation from that post on 16 April 2008, two days after the Democratic Party's defeat in the general election.

Fall

On 24 January 2008 Prime Minister of Italy Romano Prodi lost a vote of confidence in the Senate by a vote of 161 to 156 votes, causing the downfall of his government. Prodi's resignation led President Giorgio Napolitano to request the President of the Senate, Franco Marini, to assess the possibility to form a caretaker government. The other possibility would have been to call for early elections immediately. Marini acknowledged impossibility to form an interim government due to the unavailability of the centre-right parties, and early elections were scheduled for 13 and 14 April 2008.

Investiture votes

Party breakdown

Beginning of term

Ministers

Ministers and other members
 Independents (Olive Tree area): Prime minister, 1 minister, 4 undersecretaries
 Democrats of the Left (DS): 9 ministers, 5 deputy ministers, 23 undersecretaries
 Democracy is Freedom – The Daisy (DL): 8 ministers, 3 deputy ministers, 18 undersecretaries
 Communist Refoundation Party (PRC): 1 minister, 1 deputy minister, 6 undersecretaries
 Rose in the Fist (RnP): 1 minister, 1 deputy minister, 3 undersecretaries
 Italian Radicals (RI): 1 minister
 Italian Democratic Socialists (SDI): 1 deputy minister, 3 undersecretaries
 Italy of Values (IdV): 1 minister, 2 undersecretaries
 Independents (PdCI area):  1 minister, 2 undersecretaries
 Federation of the Greens (FdV): 1 minister, 2 undersecretaries
 Independents: 1 ministers, 6 undersecretaries
 Union of Democrats for Europe (UDEUR): 1 minister, 2 undersecretaries
 Lega per l'Autonomia – Alleanza Lombarda (LAL): 1 undersecretary
 The Socialists: 1 undersecretary
 United Democratic Christians (DCU): 1 undersecretary

End of term

Ministers

Ministers and other members
 Democratic Party (PD): Prime minister, 18 ministers, 8 deputy ministers, 40 undersecretaries
 Communist Refoundation Party (PRC): 1 minister, 1 deputy minister, 6 undersecretaries
 Democratic Left (SD): 1 minister, 3 undersecretaries
 Federation of the Greens (FdV): 1 minister, 2 undersecretaries
 Italy of Values (IdV): 1 minister, 2 undersecretaries
 Independents: 1 ministers, 2 undersecretaries
 Independents (PdCI area): 1 minister, 1 undersecretary
 Italian Radicals (RI): 1 minister
 Socialist Party (PS): 1 deputy minister, 3 undersecretaries
 Lega per l'Autonomia – Alleanza Lombarda (LAL): 1 undersecretary
 The Italian Socialists (SI): 1 undersecretary
 United Democratic Christians (DCU): 1 undersecretary

Council of Ministers

Composition

Sources
Italian Government - Prodi II Cabinet

References

Italian governments
2006 establishments in Italy
2008 disestablishments in Italy
Cabinets established in 2006
Cabinets disestablished in 2008
History of the Communist Refoundation Party
Romano Prodi